George Graham (19 January 1966) born in Stirling, is a Scottish former professional rugby league and rugby union footballer; his role was prop forward. At 5'7" he was quite short for international rugby.

Rugby League career

He played for Carlisle RLFC from 1993 to 1996, scoring 6 tries, and represented Scotland during that time.

Rugby Union career

Amateur career

He played for Stirling County.

Provincial and professional career

He played for Glasgow District, while still at Stirling County.

When rugby union turned professional he was signed by Newcastle Falcons and made 12 appearances for them as they won the 1997-98 Premiership.

International career

He played for Scotland 'B' on 5 December 1987 against Italy 'B'.

He gained 25 caps for Scotland national rugby union team. Graham won his first cap against Australia at Murrayfield, 22 Nov 1997 and played his final test against Wales at Millennium Stadium, 6 Apr 2002 which Scotland won 22–27.

Coaching career

Since retiring from playing Graham has moved into coaching. He was the Scotland forwards' coach with Frank Hadden until 2008 where he was let go following a review of the backroom staff after a disappointing 6 Nations campaign. The following year he became the head coach at Gala RFC where he has earned plaudits for the team's style of play.

Recently he has been linked to positions back in the professional ranks of the SRU once more, amongst which were for forwards coach at Edinburgh Rugby following Tom Smith's departure and also as a possible interim manager of the national side after Andy Robinson's resignation as coach in November 2012.

In late 2017 he took over from Darren Cunningham as coach of Hawick RFC who had lost 10 consecutive league games and sitting bottom of the BT Premiership but somehow managed to win 6 of their last 8 games and not just avoid automatic relegation but also a play off v Jed Forest and completed what many call "The Great Escape"

References

External links 
 Statistics at scrum.com
 Statistics at rugbyleagueproject.org

1966 births
Living people
Carlisle RLFC players
Dual-code rugby internationals
Footballers who switched code
Glasgow District (rugby union) players
Newcastle Falcons players
Rugby league players from Stirling
Rugby union players from Stirling
Scotland international rugby union players
Scotland national rugby league team players
Scottish rugby league players
Scottish rugby union players
Stirling County RFC players
Scotland 'B' international rugby union players